"C7osure (You Like)" is a song by American rapper and singer Lil Nas X. It is the seventh track on his second EP, 7 (2019). The song was produced by Boi-1da and Allen Ritter, with miscellaneous production by Abaz and X-Plosive.

Background
German producers X-Plosive and Abaz created a sketch for the beat two years prior to its release. In an interview with Rolling Stone, they said they "had Drake on our minds [making that], something really melodic."

Lyrics and composition

In the song, Lil Nas X tells his fans that he plans to never have a solid plan. Desire Thompson of Vibe states that the message of the song is about "pushing forward, despite fears of what's on the other side."

On June 30, 2019, the last day of Pride Month, Lil Nas X tweeted that the lyrics of "C7osure" talk about his sexuality. He also tweeted the track cover that has a rainbow colored building, going as far as to say "dead-ass thought I made it obvious", and showing two pictures of the EP cover. One with how it normally looks, and one where the picture is zoomed in on the rainbow building. He said that the lyrics of "C7osure" confirm his identification as a member of the LGBT community.

Reception
Craig Jenkins of Vulture describes the track as "a promising up-tempo disco jam." Jenkins describes "C7osure" and "Panini" as "breezy, catchy love songs."

Personnel
 Lil Nas X – lead artist
 Boi-1da – production
 Allen Ritter – production
 Abaz – miscellaneous production
 X-Plosive – miscellaneous production
 DJ Riggins – assistant engineering
 Jacob Richards – assistant engineering
 Mike Seaberg – assistant engineering
 Ray Charles Brown, Jr. – recording engineer
 Jaycen Joshua – mixing
 Eric Lagg – mastering

Charts

References 

American disco songs
LGBT-related songs
Lil Nas X songs
2019 songs
Songs written by Lil Nas X
Songs written by Allen Ritter
Songs written by Boi-1da